The canton of Issy-les-Moulineaux is an administrative division of the Hauts-de-Seine department, in northern France. It was created at the French canton reorganisation which came into effect in March 2015. Its seat is in Issy-les-Moulineaux.

It consists of the following communes:
Issy-les-Moulineaux

References

Cantons of Hauts-de-Seine